Narrangullen, New South Wales is a rural locality of Yass Valley Council on the south side of Lake Burrinjuck on the road between Yass and Wee Jasper, about 60 km northwest of Canberra. Narrangullen had a "provisional" school in 1943.

References

Localities in New South Wales
Yass Valley Council
Southern Tablelands